Cosmopterix bifidiguttata is a moth of the family Cosmopterigidae. It is known from Jiangxi and Zhejiang, China.

The length of the forewings is about 4.6 mm.

The larvae feed on Poaceae species.

References

bifidiguttata